Victor Anthony Fedeli  (born August 8, 1956) is a Canadian politician who has been the Ontario minister of economic development, job creation and trade since 2019 and chair of Cabinet since 2018. He is the Member of Provincial Parliament (MPP) for Nipissing, and has held his seat for the Progressive Conservative (PC) party of Ontario since the 2011 provincial election. Fedeli has previously served as the province's minister of finance, Opposition leader, and interim PC party leader. He stood as a candidate in the 2015 Ontario PC leadership race, but ultimately withdrew and endorsed Christine Elliott.

Prior to his entry into politics, Fedeli founded the advertising company Fedeli Advertising in his hometown of North Bay. He was active in the local community, serving on the municipal police board, and in the local chamber of commerce. Fedeli was mayor of North Bay, Ontario from 2003 to 2010.

Background

Personal life
Fedeli was born and raised in North Bay, to Lena (née Fava) Fedeli and A.R. "Hub" Fedeli. He is of Italian ancestry. He studied visual communications at Conestoga College and business at Nipissing University.

Fedeli and his wife Patty (née Kelly) reside in Corbeil, Ontario.

Fedeli Corporation
In 1978, Fedeli returned to North Bay and opened Fedeli Advertising, which, in 1989, the Profit ranked his firm as one of 50 best places to work in Canada. Fedeli was also recognized as one of Canada's Most successful entrepreneurs in an episode of MoneyMakers. Fedeli Advertising was sold in 1992.

Community service

Local service
Fedeli served ten terms on the board of the North Bay and District Chamber of Commerce, including as president in 1986. He has also served on the area's police board, health board, and conservation authority.

Fedeli was recognized for his work in North Bay with the non-profit Air Base Corporation (ABPC), where he served as chairman from inception until 2002. His time there included a lawsuit against the federal government which resulted in a $3 million award to ABPC. Fedeli was named North Bay's Citizen of the Year in 1999.

Fedeli received the Rotary International Paul Harris Fellowship in 1999, the Queen's Golden Jubilee Medal in 2002, and the Queen's Diamond Jubilee Medal in 2012. He was appointed honorary lieutenant colonel of The Algonquin Regiment in 2010, and honorary colonel in 2013.

Internationally, Fedeli served as a director with Global Vision.

Philanthropy
Fedeli served as chair of several local fundraising campaigns and has provided nearly $2 million in area donations. His donations to Canadore College include $250,000 to fund the Vittorio Fedeli Business Centre (named after Fedeli's grandfather), $100,000 to construct a lecture hall named after his father, and $100,000 for the Centre for All Media. Subsequently, Canadore College enlisted him to serve as chair of their campaign to fund a School of Aviation.

He funded the Critical Care Unit at the North Bay Regional Health Center with a $150,000 donation, and funded the Family Center at the Nipissing Serenity Hospice with a further $150,000 donation. Area libraries and other educational facilities also feature Fedeli rooms.

As mayor of North Bay, Fedeli chose to donate his annual salary to various charities. He provided the media with an auditor's statement each year, outlining the $350,000 in donations.

Political career

Mayor of North Bay
In 2003, Fedeli ran for mayor of North Bay, and was elected with 75% of the vote. In office, he focused on fiscal prudence that led him into frequent conflict with Liberal MPP Monique Smith. Fedeli and Smith sparred over the level of funding the city received from the Province of Ontario, specifically its share of the Ontario Municipal Partnership Fund.

To raise revenues and increase residential development in the city, Fedeli undertook the sale of surplus publicly owned lands. This led to 115 parcels of property being sold, bringing in about $8 million, and greater housing construction, including the gentrification of many areas of the city.

In the 2006 mayoral election, Fedeli was challenged by Stan Lawlor. Despite Lawlor's high profile as a former mayor and candidate for the Liberal Party of Ontario, Fedeli was re-elected with more than two-thirds of the vote.

In 2009, Fedeli successfully launched an effort to win an exemption for Canadian businesses from the Buy American provision of the American Recovery and Reinvestment Act of 2009. He championed a mayor-to-mayor campaign, calling U.S. mayors of cities exporting to his hometown.

Fedeli's time as mayor was also marked by investments in social housing, the only municipality to do so, and the development of a methane-powered generation facility at the municipal landfill, also unique among communities the size of North Bay. Total building starts hit a record of $92 million in 2009, compared with a 10-year average of $35 million before Fedeli was mayor. Before the end of Fedeli's term, the city's credit rating with Moody had jumped five levels to AA1, their highest possible rating.

On February 1, 2010, Fedeli announced he would not seek a third term as mayor in the October municipal election, keeping his promise from his first campaign in 2003 that he would only serve two terms. Fedeli stated "his work was done; his Council had restored hope and restored solvency."

Provincial politics

Nipissing MPP
On January 13, 2011, Fedeli announced his candidacy to be the Progressive Conservative candidate in the 2011 provincial election. The only other candidate at the time was Bill Vrebosch, mayor of East Ferris, who had run against then-MPP Monique Smith in the 2007 Ontario election. Vrebosch dropped out of the race soon after, citing family health concerns, and Fedeli was acclaimed the PC candidate on February 26, 2010. He won the seat on election day over Liberal candidate Catherine Whiting, New Democratic candidate Henri Giroux and Green Party candidate Scott Haig with more than half the valid votes cast. Fedeli was re-elected in the 2014 election, and again in the 2018 election.

Critic roles
Following the 2011 election, PC Leader Tim Hudak named Fedeli as Energy critic and the Northern Development and Mines critic. However, after Frank Klees abandoned his bid for Speaker, Hudak assigned him the Transportation critic portfolio, which was previously the responsibility of Norm Miller. Miller was then appointed critic for Northern Development and Mines. On September 10, 2013, it was announced that Fedeli would be replacing Peter Shurman as PC Finance critic.

Fedeli's coverage of the energy portfolio coincided with growing opposition in rural Ontario to the governing Liberals' Green Energy Act, and the controversy over the Liberal's cancellation of gas-fired electricity generating stations in Oakville and Mississauga. Fedeli was named PC lead on the Standing Committee on Justice Policy, investigating the circumstances surrounding the gas plant cancellations. On June 6, 2013, Fedeli and fellow Progressive Conservative Rob Leone wrote to Ontario Provincial Police Commissioner Chris Lewis asking him to order an investigation into "theft of taxpayer property and breach of public trust" in relation to the deletion and removal of emails from government computers. The scandal contributed to the resignation of Premier Dalton McGuinty and Energy Minister Chris Bentley. It also led to the arrest and conviction of David Livingston, McGuinty's chief of staff.

ONTC divestment
On March 23, 2012, the province announced it would be selling the Ontario Northland Transportation Commission (ONTC). The ONTC is headquartered in North Bay, and several hundred workers employed within Nipissing would have been directly impacted by the move. The divestiture announcement was largely unanticipated as then-Liberal leader Dalton McGuinty had signed a pledge in 2002 to not privatize the corporation.

In April, Fedeli revealed that the ONTC pension plan was underfunded by $150 million and challenged Northern Development and Mines Minister Rick Bartolucci to clarify the status of ONTC retirees' pensions and benefits.

One of the charges levelled at the government over their handling of the ONTC file was that there had been a lack of consultation. In an effort to draw a contrast with this, Fedeli and his caucus colleague Norm Miller undertook a tour of northern communities to meet with various stakeholders in June 2012. The same month, Fedeli claimed the government would realize 'no savings' with the divestiture of the ONTC.

With the election of Kathleen Wynne as Liberal leader and premier, a new cabinet was sworn in on February 11, 2013. Michael Gravelle took over the Ministry of Northern Development and Mines file and soon announced there would be no dramatic change in direction for the ONTC. On March 6, 2013, at Fedeli's request the Standing Committee on Public Accounts asked the auditor general to investigate the divestiture of the ONTC. On May 1, Fedeli claimed he had numbers showing the ONTC divestment would cost the government $530 million more than earlier estimates. Soon thereafter, Gravelle disclosed to a meeting of the Federation of Northern Ontario Municipalities in Parry Sound that "[w]e need to be open to options other than divestment", a shift in direction that he attributed to feedback he had received since taking over the northern development and mines portfolio.

On September 18, 2013, the Standing Committee on Estimates approved a motion brought forward by Fedeli ordering the release of Ministry of Finance Documents relating to the ONTC in the months prior to the 2011 election.

Following Patrick Brown's ouster as PC leader and leader of the official opposition, Fedeli assumed these positions on an interim basis.

In government
On June 29, 2018, Fedeli was sworn in as finance minister under newly the elected premier, Doug Ford. He was also appointed chair of Cabinet.

After less than a year in the finance portfolio, Fedeli shuffled into the economic development, job creation and trade portfolio on June 20, 2019.

Parliamentary roles
Member, Standing Committee on Finance and Economic Affairs
PC lead, Standing Committee on Justice
Critic, energy (October 26, 2011 – September 30, 2013)
Critic, finance (September 10, 2013 – January 30, 2018)
Leader of the Opposition in Ontario (January 26, 2018 – June 29, 2018)
Minister of finance and chair of Cabinet (June 29, 2018 – June 20, 2019)
 Minister of economic development and chair of Cabinet (June 20, 2019 – present)

Electoral record

Provincial electoral record

Municipal electoral record

Cabinet posts

References

External links
 
 

1956 births
Canadian people of Italian descent
Conestoga College alumni
Finance ministers of Ontario
Living people
Mayors of North Bay, Ontario
Members of the Executive Council of Ontario
Nipissing University alumni
Leaders of the Progressive Conservative Party of Ontario
Progressive Conservative Party of Ontario MPPs
21st-century Canadian politicians